The 1977 National Women's Conference was held November 18–21, in Houston, Texas. The purpose of this conference was to celebrate International Women's Year and also to create resolutions for women to discuss and address.

This was an important event for minority and Latina women in particular, as it gave them, a platform with which to voice their concerns. It brought attention to the issues of minority women, which were often overshadowed by those of the white majority, as one attendee, Jane Hickie, explained: “I don't believe that Anglo women had heard directly expressed those sorts of frustrations from other women who were Mexican American or Puerto Rican American, Latinas, ever before.”

Latina women in America

Hispanic women 

According to the United States Census Bureau, as of March 1977, there were 5.7 million women of Spanish-origin in the United States. These woman are of Mexican, Puerto Rican, and Cuban descent, as well as from Central or South America and other Spanish-speaking countries.[5]

Mexican-American women 

In the United States, Mexican Americans constitute as the second largest minority group. They are also often stereotyped as migrant workers - even forming the largest amount of migrants in general.

Chicanas complete an average of ten years of school, about two years less than do women in the population at large. In addition, 71 percent of Chicana women had earned less than $5,000 a year. Chicanas are considered the largest single ethnic group among household workers.

In March 1976, 17.2 percent of females in Mexican American families, who worked anytime during 1975, 60.3 percent had earnings below the poverty level.[5]

Puerto Rican women 

In the census of 1977, it showed that there was 1.7 million Puerto Ricans living in the United States. The female population makes up a total of 934,000 female Puerto Ricans.

On Average, of the 934,000 female Puerto Ricans, have completed 10.1 years of school; 24 percent completed high school; and only 2 percent are college graduates.

Puerto Rican women are often disadvantaged by lack of bilingual services and programs. This affects their educational attainment and employment opportunities. 
An estimate of half of the Puerto Rican women are working as service workers in the labor force. A couple of Puerto Rican women with incomes, 66 percent earn less than $5,000. Data collected, indicates that in 1976, 38 percent of Puerto Rican families in the United States were headed by women. [5]

Cuban-American women 

The Cuban population is estimated to be around one million. Cuban women stand higher with their education than other groups of Hispanic women. Bilingual and bicultural education and services are a priority for them.

Whilst many Cuban Americans wait for full immigration status, these procedures are slow and continue to be looked down as an obstacle to their full integration into the employment and political life in the United States.[5]

Organizations

Mexican American Women's National Association 

MANA was organized in the year 1974. A group of Chicanas who lived in Washington D.C. began gathering weekend brunches to discuss their exclusion from the feminist movements agenda and their relative invisibility in policy making meetings. Many of the founders who held jobs in the federal government, in congress, or with private policy making groups, inferred that Chicanas needed an organization just like other groups formed by White and African American women.

By 1975, MANA had elected their first officers and defined their goals. Such goals included: advocating for issues relevant to Chicanas, developing leadership opportunities, creating a national awareness of Chicana concerns, and national communications network developing for Chicanas. Later that year, MANA hosted its first national conference for and by Chicanas.

MANA convinced policymakers to change federal regulations after observing an increasing number of sterilization amongst Chicanas. This was done to ensure that Mexican American women understood the surgical process and its consequences. As well as women receiving information in their primary language. MANA has called for pharmaceutical labeling in Spanish and in English. They worked for employment opportunities, and sought appointments to government boards and commissions for Hispanics.

MANA representatives have also testified before congress on domestic violence and child support enforcement. MANA supports affirmative action, reproductive rights, the Equal Rights Amendment (ERA), pay equity, and welfare reform to change policies that held back women attempting to become economically independent.
In 2005, MANA focused on health care, lack of health insurance among Hispanics, and creating ways to access both.

Issues discussed 

"For these approximately 15 million minority women and girls, all the resolutions in this National Plan of Action have special significance. They reflect needs that are even greater than those of white women. Some selected information in the areas of health, reproductive freedom, education and employment is cited here:" [5]

Health 

The life expectancy for minority women was 72.3 years in 1975. In comparison, for white women, life expectancy was 77.2 years. Maternal mortality was 29.0 per 100,000 minority women, as opposed to 9.1 per 100,000 white women. Among minority women, infant mortality rate was 24.2 per 1,000 non-white births as compared with 16.1 per 1,000 in the overall population.

Poor nutrition is more likely visible for minority women as well as the children born. She is less prone to see a doctor or dentist or to be covered by health insurance and is less likely to have access to a hospital or clinic. As a result, this lack of access to adequate health care is an example of economic status; the interaction of income with race and sex.[5]

Reproductive freedom 

Minority women are likely of not knowing how to access information, health care, and family planning techniques that educate them with reproductive freedom. Due to the disproportionate presence of minority women, among poorer groups, depend on Federally funded health care. The restrictions on Medicaid funding abortion, has led to an increase of deaths and injuries from illegal or self-induced abortions. These restrictions has incremented sterilization through 'bargaining'; that is, allowing a woman to have an abortion solely if she agrees to be sterilized.

Minority women are more likely to become the subject of experimental medical techniques and drugs and undergo more sterilization without informed consent.[5]

Education 

Collectively, minority women received less formal education than white women. As of March 1977, white women aged 25 and older had completed 12.4 years of school, whereas, compared to 11.7 years of minority women who were in the same range of age. In continuation of March 1977, 64 percent of minority women workers had graduated from high school. This included 12 percent of women who had completed four or more years of college. However, minority women with high school or higher education levels still received lower salaries than educated white women and lower salaries than minority and white men with much less education.[5]

Employment 

Minority women rank below minority men and white men. According to the U.S. Bureau of Labor Statistics data shows that in 1975, the average minority female worker earned 26 percent less than the average minority male, and 43 percent less than the average white male. These statistics are prevalent to minority women since 28 percent of the 7.5 million families are headed by women. One-third of all families headed by women are below the poverty level. This is seen more through Black and Hispanic families.

Unemployment rates for minority women are considerably higher than those for white women and minority and white men. For example, minority women unemployment rate was 13.3 percent in 1977 compared with the 7.8 percent rate of their white counterparts. The unemployment rate for female minority teenagers was 39.0 percent in 1976.

As of March 1977, 45 percent of employed minority women were in white collar jobs, compared to the 66 percent of employed white women. About 23 percent of white women were working in higher paying, professional-technical, and managerial positions, compared with the 18 percent of minority women. Sixteen percent of minority women occupied lower paying careers (e.g., assemblers, inspectors, semiskilled factory workers) compared to the 10 percent of white women.

In 1976, the median income for all white families in the U.S. was about $15,620. For families headed by women, the median income was $8,226 for whites and $5,140 for minorities. Minority women tend to be the support system in large households, and/ or to be married to men who earn less than the averaged income. As a result, producing more pressure on their earnings.[5]

See also
 Rachel Navarro

Sources

1977 in the United States
Hispanic and Latino American women
Latin American people
Women's conferences
1977 in women's history
1977 conferences